The Falklands Expedition occurred in late 1831 when the United States Navy warship USS Lexington was dispatched to investigate the seizure of three whalers at the settlement of Puerto Luis founded in the ruins of the former Spanish penal colony of Puerto Soledad by Luis Vernet.  Vernet had sought to control sealing in the islands and seized the ships alleging they had violated his regulations controlling sealing in the islands (US sealers did not recognise his authority and had ignored them). Finding one of the ships being outfitted with guns, Captain Duncan seized six of the senior officers in the settlement on charges of piracy.  The damage done to the settlement is disputed.  Duncan reports spiking the guns of the settlement and a powder store.  Vernet was to later claim his settlement was ransacked.  

The settlers complained of the conditions they were living in and asserted that Vernet had misled them.  Duncan offered passage to the mainland and the majority of settlers chose to leave, leaving behind a small party.  In late 1832, Argentine warships challenged American sealers in the area again, prompting the US consul to consider a second punitive expedition with orders to sink the Argentine ship ARA Sarandi.  This prompted the British to reassert sovereignty over the islands. Historically, the Argentine government has disputed the rights to the islands with the United Kingdom and it culminated in the Falklands War of 1982.

See also
Brazil Squadron
Capture of Port Egmont
Reassertion of British sovereignty over the Falkland Islands (1833)

References

Falklands
United States Navy in the 19th century
History of the Falkland Islands
Punitive expeditions of the United States